Qoşaqışlaq (also, Khardashan, Khardashan, Kishlak, Koshakishlag, and Koshakyshlak) is a village in Baku, Azerbaijan.

References 

Populated places in Baku